Joe McCracken is an Australian politician. He has been a member of the Victorian Legislative Council since November 2022, representing Western Victoria. McCracken is a member of the Liberal Party.

References 

Living people
Members of the Victorian Legislative Council
Liberal Party of Australia members of the Parliament of Victoria
21st-century Australian politicians
Year of birth missing (living people)